Kallimini is a tribe of brush-footed butterflies.

List of genera 
 Catacroptera Karsch, 1894 – pirates
 Doleschallia C. & R. Felder, 1860
 Hypolimnas – eggflies, diadems (tentatively placed here)
 Kallima Doubleday, 1849 – oakleaf butterflies, oakleaves
 Mallika Collins & Larsen, 1991 – Jackson's leaf butterfly

In some classifications, Hypolimnas is placed in the Junoniini.

References 

 
Nymphalinae
Taxa named by William Doherty
Butterfly tribes